Spacewalk is open-source systems management software for system provisioning, patching and configuration licensed under the GNU GPLv2.

The project was discontinued on 31 May 2020 with 2.10 being the last official release. SUSE forked the spacewalk code base in 2018 with uyuni-project

Overview

Features 

Spacewalk encompasses the following functions:

 Systems Inventory (Hardware and Software)
 System Software Installation and Updates
 Collation and Distribution of Custom Software Packages into Manageable Groups
 System provisioning (via Kickstart)
 Management and deployment of configuration files
 Provision of virtual Guests
 Start/Stop/Configuration of virtual guests
 OpenSCAP Auditing of client systems

Architecture 

Spacewalk Server: Server represents managing System
 It is possible to set up primary and worker servers, and even a tree setup is possible
 There are options for geographically remote proxy servers

Spacewalk Client: A system managed by a Spacewalk server
 Compatible Client OS's are drawn from:
Red Hat Enterprise Linux (RHEL)
CentOS
Fedora
Scientific Linux
Oracle Linux (OL)
SUSE Linux Enterprise Server (SLES)
openSUSE
Solaris – limited and deprecated support
Debian – limited support

Spacewalk is controlled by the following Interfaces:
 web interface, Used for most interactions
 CLI (Command-line interface), Used for some specific operations
 XML-RPC API, programmatic interface for specialist/development use

Subscription Management:
 Particular upstream and downstream versions may include integration to supported vendor subscription support network such as Red Hat Subscription Management (RHSM), ULN, and SUSE Enterprise Linux Server subscriptions.

Backend Database:
 While formerly requiring the commercial Oracle Database as a backend, version 1.7 (released in March 2012) added support for PostgreSQL.

Upstream and downstream versions 

A number of DownStream  versions use upstream Spacewalk version as the basis of their System Provision, patch and errata management:
 Red Hat Satellite 5.x
 Oracle's "Spacewalk for Oracle® Linux"
 SUSE Manager Server

Support for particular client OSes, server OSes, system architectures, backend databases, and subscription services varies between versions and releases.

Oracle Spacewalk 

Oracle introduced their own version of Spacewalk particularly to provide a familiar alternative for those switching from a different vendor while Oracle Enterprise Manager remains Oracle Corporation's preferred way of managing systems.

Spacewalk for Oracle® Linux is designed to be hosted on Oracle Linux (OL).

The about section of the release notes in Oracle Spacewalk 2.x Documentation indicate only minor branding changes and changes for GPG keys

Red Hat Satellite 5 

Red Hat Satellite 5 is a licensed downstream adaption of Spacewalk with added functionality to manage Red Hat Enterprise Linux Subscriptions.  In the active years of the Red Hat Satellite 5 lifecycle Spacewalk was simply known as the upstream project for Satellite.  The relationship between Spacewalk and Red Hat Satellite 5 was analogous to the relationship between Fedora and Red Hat Enterprise Linux.  With the emergence of Red Hat Satellite 6 with based on a fundamentally different toolset, end of lifecycle phase of Red Hat Satellite 5 and the emergence of downstream spacewalk based offerings from Oracle and SUSE newer versions of Spacewalk may not have this close relationship.

SUSE Manager Server 

In March 2011 Novell released SUSE Manager 1.2, based on Spacewalk 1.2 and supporting the management of both SUSE Linux Enterprise and Red Hat Enterprise Linux.

In May 2018, during the openSUSE conference in Prague, it was announced that a fork of Spacewalk, called Uyuni, was being created. Named after the salt flat in Bolivia, Uyuni uses Salt for configuration management and React as the user interface framework.

From version 4.0, SUSE Manager is based on Uyuni as its upstream project.

History and development

Development 

Red Hat developed the Red Hat Network to manage subscriptions software management and created the Red Hat Satellite application as a central management point with the user network.

For Red Hat Satellite version 5 the Satellite Function was implemented by a toolset named Project Spacewalk.

Red Hat announced in June 2008 Project Spacewalk was to be made open source under the GPLv2 License

Satellite 5.3 was the first version to be based on upstream Spacewalk code.

Stewardship and governance 

In the Spacewalk FAQ issued in 2015 after the release of Red Hat Satellite 6 Red Hat.
 Red Hat formally released Spacewalk as open source(GPLv2) in June 2008
 Red Hat continues to sponsor and support Spacewalk as the upstream Red Hat Satellite 5. However that participation is anticipated to diminish as Red Hat Satellite 5 enters the final phases of its lifecycle. Spacewalk is not and can never be upstream for Red Hat Satellite 6 released in September 2014  due to it being a ground up rebuild with a different toolset.
 The Spacewalk project can continue to grow and flourish provided that the community continues to find it a useful tool and is willing to support it.

Satellite 5 went end-of-life on 31 May 2020, the Spacewalk project was discontinued at the same time.

Builds

Upstream build

Releases

Criticisms
In a 2019 paper considering Linux open-source patching tools Spacewalk was commended for having a software inventory and community support but limited support for distributions noteabably Ubuntu was an issue.

Miscellaneous 
 The Spacewalk logo is a trademark of Red Hat, Inc.

Note

References

External links

Resources 

 
 GitHub.com repository for Spacewalk
 Upstream GitHub documentation Wiki
 Spacewalk Upstream User Documentation
 Spacewalk on Fedorahosted.org (Deprecated)
 Documentation for Red Hat Satellite 5.7 - Contains much Generally relevant for Spacewalk
 Oracle Spacewalk Documentation - Generally useful Reference
 SUSE Manager 3 Documentation

Free software programmed in Perl
Red Hat software
Remote administration software
Provisioning
Systems management